Girometti is an Italian surname. Notable people with the surname include:

Roberto Girometti (born 1939), Italian film director and cinematographer
William Girometti (1924–1998), Italian painter

Italian-language surnames